The 2002 European Junior Swimming Championships were held from 11–14 July 2002 in Linz, Austria.

Medal table

Medal summary

Boy's events

|-
| 50 m freestyle

|-
| 100 m freestyle

|-
| 200 m freestyle

|-
| 400 m freestyle

|-
| 1500 m freestyle

|-
| 50 m backstroke

|-
| 100 m backstroke

|-
| 200 m backstroke

|-
| 50 m breaststroke

|-
| 100 m breaststroke

|-
| 200 m breaststroke

|-
| 50 m butterfly

|valign=top|Nikolay SkvortsovTor Sundin
|valign=top align=right|24.67 

|-
| 100 m butterfly

|-
| 200 m butterfly

|-
| 200 m individual medley

|-
| 400 m individual medley

|-
| 4×100 m freestyle relay

|-
| 4×200 m freestyle relay

|-
| 4×100 m medley relay

 

|}

Girl's events

|-
| 50 m freestyle

|-
| 100 m freestyle

|-
| 200 m freestyle

|-
| 400 m freestyle

|-
| 800 m freestyle

|-
| 50 m backstroke

|-
| 100 m backstroke

|-
| 200 m backstroke

|-
| 50 m breaststroke

|-
| 100 m breaststroke

|-
| 200 m breaststroke

|-
| 50 m butterfly

|-
| 100 m butterfly

|-
| 200 m butterfly

|-
| 200 m individual medley

|-
| 400 m individual medley

|-
| 4×100 m freestyle relay

|-
| 4×200 m freestyle relay

|-
| 4×100 m medley relay

|}

J
S
European Junior Swimming Championships
S
Swimming competitions in Austria
Sports competitions in Linz
Swimming
July 2002 sports events in Europe